"I'll Come Running Back to You" is a song written and recorded by American singer-songwriter Sam Cooke, released November 18, 1957, by Specialty Records. The songwriting credit was attributed to "S. Cook" by the label.

Background
"I'll Come Running Back to You" was recorded at Cosimo Matassa's studio in New Orleans, Louisiana, under the supervision of Specialty Records A&R director Bumps Blackwell.

Following the smash success of Cooke's debut single "You Send Me" on Keen Records, Speciality owner Art Rupe quickly rushed out "I'll Come Running Back to You" as a single. Rupe instructed arranger René Hall to duplicate the sound of "You Send Me", which included overdubbing similar instrumentation and background singers. The overdubs were recorded on November 1, 1957 (including overdubs for "Lovable" and "Forever", also recorded during the New Orleans session) and Rupe mastered the songs four days later, rushing the record out within two weeks. Speciality purchased a three-fifths-of-a-page ad in the November 25 issue of Billboard to promote the single.

Personnel
Credits adapted from the liner notes to the 2003 compilation Portrait of a Legend: 1951–1964.
Sam Cooke – vocals
Earl Palmer – drums
Warren Myles – piano
Edgar Blanchard – guitar
Frank Fields – bass guitar
Lee Allen – tenor saxophone
Red Tyler – baritone saxophone

Charts and certifications

Weekly charts

See also
List of number-one R&B singles of 1958 (U.S.)

References

1957 singles
Sam Cooke songs
1957 songs
Songs written by Sam Cooke
Specialty Records singles